Car boot may refer to:

 Boot (car), a storage space in a car
 Wheel clamp, a device to prevent a vehicle from being moved
 Car boot sale, a market where people sell unwanted possessions from their cars